Branko Becić (14 December 1923 – 18 September 2000) was a Croatian rower. He competed in the men's eight event at the 1948 Summer Olympics.

References

1923 births
2000 deaths
Croatian male rowers
Olympic rowers of Yugoslavia
Rowers at the 1948 Summer Olympics
Sportspeople from Sarajevo